Thomas Daniel Nelson (born December 7, 1997) is an American actor. He is best known for his performances as Neil in the biopic My Friend Dahmer and Russell in The Cat and the Moon.

Career
Nelson's film debut came in 2006 playing Edward Jr. Age 6–7 in Robert De Niro's, The Good Shepherd. In 2012, he played Nickleby, a Khaki Scout, in the coming-of-age film Moonrise Kingdom. Since then, he has transitioned into maturer roles beginning with his portrayal of Neil in My Friend Dahmer. He starred as Russell in the drama film The Cat and the Moon, alongside his Dahmer costar Alex Wolff.

Outside of film, he has made guest appearances on television shows such as Gotham, Better Call Saul, and FBI.

During May to August 2019 he appeared alongside Taylor Hanks in the one-act play Fucknut (happy new year) written by Ryan Sans at Dixon Place and 13th Street Repertory Theatre.

Personal life
Nelson was born in West Haven, Connecticut and attended West Haven High School. He played guitar in jazz band and was actively involved in theatre including productions of The Drowsy Chaperone and The Laramie Project. In 2015 he was the recipient of the Connecticut Association of Schools Fine Arts Award for the Music/Theatre Division.

A Philadelphia Eagles fan, he played football during his senior year. Growing up, his favorite player was Brian Dawkins.

From September 2015 to December 2017, he attended the Film, Television, Voice-overs, & Commercial Acting (FTVC) Pace University School of Performing Arts program. He left in January 2018 to focus on acting.

Despite having naturally brown hair, Nelson admitted in an interview with BUILD Series that he kept his hair blonde and adopted the wardrobe of his character from The Cat and the Moon (joggers, sweatshirt, and a gold chain) for six months after filming ended. This can be seen in his appearance on Better Call Saul.

Filmography

Film

Television

References

External links
 
 

Living people
21st-century American male actors
Male actors from Connecticut
American male child actors
American male film actors
1997 births